Alicia Palacios Calderón (5 November 1933) is a Spanish actress and vedette.

She was introduced in the revue in the show Una muchachita de ochocientos años, she performed with Celia Gámez El águila de fuego, by Francis López. In the 1950s she appeared in films like El hombre que viajaba despacito, Los días de Cabirio, El hincha y Las muchachas de azul (1956).

In 1963 she appeared with Jesús Puente, Amparo Soto and Verónica Luján in the play Juegos de sociedad, by Juan José Alonso Millán. In 1982 he appeared in with Jesús Puente, Amparo Larrañaga, Fernando Arbolella and Aurora Redondo in Las tormentas no vuelven, by Santiago Moncada.

Filmography

Films

TV series

References

External links
 

1933 births
Spanish stage actresses
Spanish film actresses
Spanish vedettes
Living people
20th-century Spanish actresses